The pale catshark (Apristurus sibogae) is a rare catshark of the family Scyliorhinidae. The holotype, the only specimen, was found on the Makassar Strait slope at a depth of 655 m. Its length is around 21 cm, although this measurement was taken from a juvenile specimen. The reproduction of the pale catshark is oviparous.

References

pale catshark
Fish of Indonesia
Taxa named by Max Carl Wilhelm Weber
pale catshark